The Redd Foxx Show is an American television sitcom that premiered January 18, 1986 on ABC. The show was cancelled after 3 months, partly due to low ratings in its Saturday-night timeslot (the eighth episode aired in a Friday-night slot). Although the first two episodes brought in decent ratings, the show usually finished in the bottom ten for the week. A total of 13 episodes were made.

Overview
Al Hughes (Redd Foxx), a New York City diner/newsstand owner, adopts a streetwise teenager named Toni (Pamela Adlon). Diana (Rosanna DeSoto) worked with Al in the newsstand, and Jim-Jam (Nathaniel Taylor, Theodore Wilson) owned a Chinese restaurant nearby. As the series progressed, Toni "disappeared," and in came Al's ex-wife Felicia (Beverly Todd) and his foster son, Byron (Sinbad).

Cast
 Redd Foxx — Al Hughes
 Barry Van Dyke — Sgt. Dwight Stryker
 Pamela Adlon — Toni Rutledge
 Sinbad — Byron Lightfoot
 Theodore Wilson — Jim-Jam (No. 2)
 Beverly Todd — Felicia
 Ursaline Bryant- Darice Dix
 Rosanna DeSoto — Diana Olmos
 Nathaniel Taylor — Jim-Jam (No. 1)
 Charlie Adler - Ralph/Rita

Episodes

Ratings
 Episode 1: 14.2/24 (46th out of 71) 
 Episode 2: 14.9/24 (45th out of 67) 
 Episode 3: 9.0/16 (63rd out of 68) 
 Episode 4: 10.5/18 (55th out of 60) 
 Episode 5: 10.6/17 (61st out of 66) 
 Episode 6: 9.0/16 (65th out of 68) 
 Episode 7: 10.2/18 (55th out of 63) 
 Episode 8: 12.2/19 (53rd out of 69) 
 Episode 9: 9.9/17 (61st out of 69) 
 Episode 10: 10.3/19 (59th out of 65) 
 Episode 11: 8.6/16 (62nd out of 65) 
 Episode 12: 8.1/15 (67th out of 71) 
 Episode 13: 6.8/12 (62nd out of 64)

References

External links
 
 Redd Foxx: The Ironic Death of Redd Foxx Part Two

1980s American black sitcoms
1980s American sitcoms
1986 American television series debuts
1986 American television series endings
American Broadcasting Company original programming
English-language television shows
Television shows set in New York City
Television series by Lorimar Television